Legoland Water Park Gardaland is a waterpark in Italy. It is located at the Gardaland Resort and it can be accessed only via the theme park. The park was scheduled to open in 2020 but due to the COVID-19 pandemic, it was postponed to 2021.

References 

2021 establishments in Italy
Legoland
Water parks
Gardaland